Daisen can refer to:

Mount Daisen (大山) in Tottori Prefecture, Japan
Daisen, Tottori (大山町), a town in Tottori Prefecture, Japan
Daisen, Akita (大仙市), a city in Akita Prefecture, Japan